is a Japanese former figure skater. She is the 2007 NHK Trophy bronze medalist and 2009 Winter Universiade silver medalist. She won five medals on the ISU Junior Grand Prix series and placed as high as fourth at the World Junior Championships. 

Takeda is one of the seven women who defeated World and Olympic champion Yuna Kim throughout her career.

Programs

Competitive highlights
GP: Grand Prix; JGP: Junior Grand Prix

References

External links 

 

1988 births
Living people
Japanese female single skaters
Universiade medalists in figure skating
Sportspeople from Tokyo
Universiade silver medalists for Japan
Competitors at the 2009 Winter Universiade